Ramsaasalepis is an extinct genus of jawless fish. Its the type and only genus of the family Ramsaasalepididae, and contains the single species Ramsaasalepis porosa.

References

External links
 

Birkeniiformes genera
Fossil taxa described in 2002